Volgar may refer to:
Volgars, extinct people of Central Asia
Volgar language, the extinct language of the Bulgars
Volgar languages
FC Volgar Astrakhan - Russian football club

See also
Vulgar (disambiguation)
Bolgar (disambiguation)
Bulgar (disambiguation)